Kass is a surname.

Kass or L-Kass (transliterated: al Kas; El-Kas; alKass; Elkass;), or variation, may also refer to:

People
Ḳāṣṣ, Muslim preachers in early Islam
DJ Kass (born 1987), Dominican-American DJ
Edward H. Kass (1917–1990), American physician and medical researcher
Kass Fleisher (born 1959), U.S. writer
Kass Morgan (born 1984), U.S. writer
Robert Kass (born 1952), American statistician
Robin Kåss (born 1977), Norwegian politician
Ahmed El-Kass (born 1965), Egyptian soccer manager
Saeed Al Kass, Emirati soccer player

Places
Qass, Azerbaijan
Kass, Swat, Pakistan

Mass media
KASS, a radio station in Wyoming, United States
Al Kass Sports Channels, Qatari sports channels

Other uses
Kass, a character in The Legend of Zelda: Breath of the Wild

See also

 
 
 Cass (disambiguation)
 Kas (disambiguation)
 Cup (disambiguation)
 Alka (disambiguation)
 Elka (disambiguation)